Rawbank is a regulated financial institution based in the Democratic Republic of the Congo (DRC). The bank was created on 2 May 2002, and has grown to become the DRC's largest universal bank with total assets of $4.2b at FYE 2021. The bank has over 1,800 employees, and services over 500,000 corporate, SME, and retail clients through its network of 110 branches, 400+ ATM's, as well as its digital banking platforms & applications.

History
Rawbank was launched in 2002 by the Rawji family, which have a diversified set of business interests in the Democratic Rep. of Congo, that is commonly called Rawji Group.   The family traces its roots in the DRC since 1902, and is owned by the Rawji brothers, namely Mushtaque, Zahir, Mazhar, Aslam and Murtaza. The history of the Rawji group begins at the beginning of the 20th century, when Merali Rawji (father of the Mushtaque siblings) settled in Kindu, then in Kalemie and later in Kisangani, in the eastern part of what was then the Belgian Congo. The family was initially heavily involved in the coffee and cocoa trading, which was a predominant export from Eastern Congo. In 1966, the family acquired Beltexco, a textile products distribution entity which had a national presence.

The directors of this group of companies are descendants of the founder (Merlan Rawji). They grew up in the Belgian Congo, and went to Europe to complete their education. In the early 1990s, the war rocked the Democratic Republic of the Congo (DRC), but the Rawji group continued to maintain & expand their business activities. They set up in the capital, Kinshasa, and continued to diversify their portfolio of activities with the following;

- Prodimpex S.A.; Importer & distributor of a series of automotive products and accessories.   Represents exclusively General Motors, BMW, Isuzu, Yamaha etc.

- Marsavco S.A., and entity that was acquired from Unilever; which is a palm oil processing plant which produces soaps, detergents, margarine, and refined cooking oils; these are subsequently distributed throughout & marketed under proprietary brands.

- Created CIMKO; the DRC's largest cement manufacturing facility with an annual capacity of 1.2 million metric tons.

- Founded RawSur first private insurance company providing a large breadth of insurance products in the life & non-life segments.

- Parkland, actively engaging in real estate development, construction & distributing concrete derivatives to the DRC construction industry.

- Proton SA is an electrical engineering & services which produces copper wiring & cables used in electricity transmission.  Its wide range of products cater to heavy industrial uses or light residential purposes.

Operations
Rawbank is a full-service financial institution catering to corporates, SMEs, retail, and institutions. It offers a complete range of financial products catered to each market segment. It is a member of the SWIFT interbank network.   Rawbank currently has 105 branches geographically spread throughout the country, hosts a network of 300+ ATMs, and is a principal member of the Visa & MasterCard networks, and represents Moneygram International in the DRC.   Rawbank SA remains committed to providing financial services through traditional distribution channels, as well as through its digital channels.  Its five-year strategy is centered on a digital-first strategy, to ensure it meets its targets of financial inclusion to the underserved population of the DRC.

, Rawbank was the largest commercial bank in DR Congo, with 28 percent of banking assets in the country and a customer base of nearly 300,000 accounts. Rawbank was the first financial house in DR Congo to offer mortgages to the public in 2015.

, sixty percent of Rawbank's customers maintained retail accounts. The introduction of mobile money accounts has enabled the bank to attract clients in remote locations, as has the introduction of internet banking. The bank is growing its clientele by focusing on (a) the un-banked population (b) young people (c) small to medium-sized businesses and (d) businesses owned by women.

Awards
 Bank of the Year DRC - 2009 (The Banker)
	Bank of the Year DRC - 2010 (The Banker)
	Bank of the Year DRC - 2011 (The Banker)
	Safest Banks 2015 - DRC (Global Finance)
	Safest Banks 2016 - DRC (Global Finance)
	Best Bank in DRC 2017 (Global Finance)
	Best Bank in DRC 2018 (Global Finance)
	Best Bank in DRC 2019 (Global Finance)
	ranked 4th in the ranking of Central African banks in 2019 (Jeune Afrique)
	ranked in the top 5 most famous companies in Central Africa in 2020 (Conseil français des investisseurs en Afrique (CIAN))

Branch Network
As at the end of 2021 Rawbank operated 110 branches (includes branches and sub-branches), across the Democratic Republic of Congo. as well as 400+ ATM's

Partnerships
Rawbank has forged strategic partnerships with international and pan-African development financial institutions (DFI's) in order to strengthen its position amongst the SME segment, and more particularly Rawbank's Lady's First initiative, a successful dedicated financing program to promote & empower women in business by providing training, assistance, and financing to women entrepreneurs across the country. In 2019, these partnerships with DFI's have raised US$143 million in financing programs. The partner institutions are: 
	The African Development Bank (AfDB)
	Shelter Africa
	International Finance Corporation (IFC)
	FPM (a financial inclusion fund)
	Proparco (A division of AFD in charge of bilateral Public-Private partnerships)
	Trade Development Bank
   BADEA (Arab Bank for Economic Development in Africa)
   Afreximbank

See also

 List of banks in the Democratic Republic of the Congo

References

External links
 Website of Rawbank

Banks of the Democratic Republic of the Congo
Companies based in Kinshasa
Banks established in 2001
2001 establishments in the Democratic Republic of the Congo